Kringle is a Northern European pastry, a variety of pretzel. Pretzels were introduced by Roman Catholic monks in the 13th century in Denmark, and from there they spread throughout Scandinavia and evolved into several kinds of sweet, salty or filled pastries, all in the shape of kringle.

The word originates from the Old Norse kringla, meaning ring or circle.

In the Netherlands, a particular type of sweet kringle is well known under the Dutch name krakeling.

The shape of the kringle has given name to a similarly entangled feature found in some proteins, the so-called Kringle domain.

Scandinavia 

In Denmark, kringle denotes the pretzel-like knotted shape rather than the pretzel pastry type. Kringler may be made from puff pastry (like Danish pastry) or yeast dough, filled with remonce or marzipan and raisins, sprinkled with coarse sugar, nut flakes or icing.

Other types of kringle in Scandinavia includes saltkringler, which are small salty kringler - the Scandinavian equivalent of pretzels -, and kommenskringler which are half-hand-sized breads in the kringle shape, made from unsweetened yeast dough spiced with caraway seeds. Sukkerkringler are similar, but sweet pretzels, sprinkled with sugar instead of caraway. Fødselsdagskringler are a large sweet bread pretzel for birthday celebrations. Smørkringler are large crusty and sweet pretzels with a spread of butter on the backside. Smørkringler are not as popular nowadays.

Kringler are pastries with a long history in Denmark, and are still popular items in modern Danish bakeries. Nowadays, kringle is usually made with only one crossing and not two, as in the original kringle and pretzel shape.

United States

In the United States, kringles are hand-rolled from Danish pastry dough (wienerbrød dough) that has been rested overnight before shaping, filling, and baking. Many sheets of the flaky dough are layered, then shaped into an oval. After filling with fruit, nut, or other flavor combinations, the pastry is baked and iced.

Racine, Wisconsin, has historically been a center of Danish-American culture and kringle-making. A typical Racine–made kringle is a large flat oval measuring approximately 14 inches by 10 inches and weighing about 1.5 pounds. The kringle became the official state pastry of Wisconsin on June 30, 2013. A Wisconsin distillery in Middleton, Wisconsin, makes a kringle cream liqueur from Wisconsin cream, rum, sugar, and natural kringle flavor.

In other parts of the United States, kringle may refer to a slightly sweet buttermilk cookie shaped like a pretzel or figure eight.

Other places where kringles may be found in the United States include the Ballard area of Seattle, Washington; Redmond, Washington; Solvang, California; central Iowa, specifically Story City, IA; Burr Ridge, Illinois; Springfield, Missouri, and Watertown, Massachusetts. In 2005, Dana College in Blair, Nebraska, held a Kringle Kontest, which was won by Kirsten's Danish Bakery in Burr Ridge, Illinois.

Symbolism 

Baker's guilds in Europe have used the kringle or pretzel as a symbol for centuries. It is told (but currently unconfirmed by historic documents), that when Vienna was besieged by the Turkish Ottoman armies in 1529, local bakers working in the night gave the city defence an early warning of the attacking enemy. For this, they were later rewarded by the Pope, with permission to use a crown as part of their kringle guild symbol.

For unknown reasons, the guild in Denmark is now the only baker's guild in the world with official authority to display a royal crown as part of their baker's guild trade symbol that is often hung outside of bakery shops.

See also
 Danish cuisine
 Estonian cuisine
 King cake
 Norwegian cuisine

References

External links 
Racine Kringle Recipe taste of home
https://www.foodnetwork.com/recipes/kringle-recipe0-1941189 Racine Kringle Recipe] Food Network

Danish pastries
Estonian cuisine
Norwegian cuisine
Cuisine of Wisconsin
Cuisine of the Midwestern United States
Pretzels